Diplocystis is a genus of fungi in the Diplocystaceae family. The single species in the genus, Diplocystis wrightii, has been shown using phylogenetic analysis to be a member of the Sclerodermatineae suborder of the Boletales. The species was originally described in 1869 by Miles Joseph Berkeley and Moses Ashley Curtis, from specimens collected in the Caribbean.

References

Boletales
Taxa described in 1869
Fungi of the Caribbean
Monotypic Boletales genera
Taxa named by Miles Joseph Berkeley